The 1998–99 Georgian Cup (also known as the David Kipiani Cup) was the fifty-fifth season overall and ninth since independence of the Georgian annual football tournament.

Preliminary round 

|}
Source:

Round of 64 

|}
Source:

Round of 32 

|}
Source:

Round of 16 

|}
Source:

Quarterfinals 

|}
Source:

Semifinals 

|}
Source:

Final

See also 
 1998–99 Umaglesi Liga
 1998–99 Pirveli Liga

References

External links 
 The Rec.Sport.Soccer Statistics Foundation.
 es.geofootball.com 

Georgian Cup seasons
Cup
Georgian Cup, 1998-99